Puerto Rico Highway 869 (PR-869) is a north–south road located in Cataño, Puerto Rico. It begins at its intersection with PR-5 and PR-22 (Autopista José de Diego) near Bayamón municipal limit and ends at its junction with PR-165 near Toa Baja municipal limit.

Major intersections

Related route

Puerto Rico Highway 8869 (PR-8869) is a spur route located in Palmas barrio. It begins at PR-869 in Cucharillas community and ends at its junction with PR-5 near Puente Blanco community.

See also

 List of highways numbered 869

References

External links
 

869
Cataño, Puerto Rico